The PR3 men's coxless pair competition at the 2022 World Rowing Championships took place at the Račice regatta venue.

Schedule
The schedule was as follows:

All times are Central European Summer Time (UTC+2)

Results
All boats advanced directly to Final A.

Heat

Final A
The final determined the rankings.

References

2022 World Rowing Championships